Audovacar (from Proto-Germanic *Audawakraz) is a masculine Germanic name.

The name is attested in many variations. The name Otto is a derivative.

The medieval German form was Ottokar, whence the Czech form Otakar. The Czech name Žiroslav (Polish Żyrosław) has the same meaning. The Greek name Plutarch also means "lord of wealth".


Attested forms

Audacar
Audacrus
Audaccrus
Audgarius
Audagarius

Autcharius
Aotackar

Odowakar
Odakar
Odacrus

Otachar
Otacar
Otacarus
Otakar

Otgarius
Otgar
Otger
Othgar
Otkger

Famous people
Adovacrius (5th century), Saxon leader in Gaul
Odoacer (d. 493), barbarian king of Italy
Autchar (8th century), Frankish diplomat
Eadwacer, character from the 9th-century Old English poem "Wulf and Eadwacer"

Notes

Bibliography

Germanic given names